Hurricane Irene was a long-lived Cape Verde hurricane during the 2005 Atlantic hurricane season. The storm formed near Cape Verde on August 4 and crossed the Atlantic, turning northward around Bermuda before being absorbed by an extratropical cyclone while situated southeast of Newfoundland. Irene proved to be a difficult storm to forecast due to oscillations in strength. After almost dissipating on August 10, Irene peaked as a Category 2 hurricane on August 16. Irene persisted for 14 days as a tropical system, the longest duration of any storm of the 2005 season. It was the ninth named storm and fourth hurricane of the record-breaking season.

Meteorological history

Hurricane Irene began as a Cape Verde storm. A vigorous tropical wave moved off the west coast of Africa on August 1, initially weakening due to cooler sea surface temperatures. It moved westward and passed near Cape Verde, where convection started to increase. The system subsequently developed into a tropical depression on the afternoon of August 4, 690 miles (1100 km) southwest of the Cape Verde Islands. Early on August 5, the depression abruptly turned to the northwest into an area of higher wind shear, causing some computer models to predict that the depression would dissipate, while others predicted steady strengthening. The sudden threat to the storm's existence prompted National Hurricane Center (NHC) forecaster Lixion Avila to comment, "How little we know about the genesis of tropical cyclones." Despite the unfavorable conditions in its vicinity and its poor organization, Tropical Depression Nine continued to strengthen, becoming Tropical Storm Irene on August 7.

Because Irene was in an environment laden with dry air and high shear, it soon weakened to a tropical depression, on August 8. On the morning of August 10, as it was passing north of the Lesser Antilles, Irene nearly dissipated into a remnant low, but forecasters predicted with "very low confidence" that the storm would survive. Contrary to these expectations, warmer waters and less wind shear allowed Irene to become gradually more organized while south of Bermuda, and it became a tropical storm once again early on August 11.

Due to uncertainties about how the region's subtropical ridge would interact with Irene, the models continued to give unclear signals of the storm's future. Some of the models predicted that Irene would make landfall in North Carolina, while others continued to anticipate that Irene would dissipate. The uncertainty ended when a weakness in the subtropical ridge allowed Irene to turn sharply northward, which caused the storm to pass midway between the Outer Banks of North Carolina and Bermuda on August 15. Soon after, upper-level shear weakened greatly, and Irene rapidly intensified, first to a hurricane, then to its peak strength as a 105 mph (170 km/h) Category 2 hurricane on the afternoon of August 16, while located 350 miles (560 km) northeast of Bermuda; at the same time it also attained minimum pressure of 970 mbar. Though NHC meteorologists thought it was likely that Irene would become a hurricane, they were not expecting an intensification of such a magnitude.

Irene entered a region of increased wind shear and began to weaken, and as a result it was downgraded to a tropical storm early on August 18, when it was 520 miles (830 km) south of Cape Race, Newfoundland. All convection within 230 mi (370 km) of the cyclone dissipated on August 18. Irene was subsequently absorbed by an extratropical cyclone later that day. Irene lasted for 14 days as a tropical system, the longest duration of any storm of the 2005 season.

Impact and records
As Hurricane Irene stayed well away from land, no coastal warnings or watches were issued for it. Despite Irene's long life there were no reports of tropical storm force winds affecting ships. There was no damage as a result of Irene. 

However, the hurricane generated strong waves and increased the risk of rip currents along the East Coast of the United States. Many beaches in New Jersey restricted swimming activities, and lifeguards at one beach performed more than a hundred rescues over a three-day period. Waves along the coastline of New York reached . A 16-year-old boy drowned after being caught in a rip current near Long Beach, New York on August 14. His body was recovered on August 16 after washing ashore.

When Tropical Storm Irene formed on August 7, it was the earliest date for the formation of the ninth tropical storm in the Atlantic basin at the time, beating the previous record held by a storm in the 1936 season by 13 days. However, this record has since been surpassed by Hurricane Isaias in 2020, which gained tropical storm status on July 30, beating Irene by 8 days. This storm also marked the fifth occasion the name Irene had been used to name a tropical cyclone in the Atlantic.

 This storm brought the 7th highest Pemigewasset river crest of all time in Holderness, NH at 21.35 feet.
 Pemigewasset River at Woodstock (flood stage 9.0 ft), which crested at 16.5 ft.
 Pemigewasset River at Plymouth (flood stage 13.0 ft), which crested at 21.7 ft.
 Ammonoosuc River at Bethlehem (flood stage 8.0 ft), which crested at 10.9 ft.
 Baker River at Rumney (flood stage 10.0 ft), which crested at 14.0 ft.
 Saco River at Conway (flood stage 9.0 ft), which crested at 17.2.
 Smith River at Bristol (flood stage 8.0 ft), which crested at 8.2 ft.
 Connecticut River at West Lebanon (flood stage 18.0 ft), which crested at 29.6 ft.
 Suncook River at North Chichester (flood stage 7.0 ft), which crested at 8.1 ft.
 Connecticut River at Woodsville (flood stage 11.0 ft), which crested at 11.9 ft

See also

 List of Category 2 Atlantic hurricanes
 List of New Jersey hurricanes

References

External links

 National Hurricane Center's archive on Hurricane Irene
 National Hurricane Center's Tropical Cyclone Report on Hurricane Irene
 Photo gallery of surf from Hurricane Irene in North Carolina
 NASA article on Irene's rainfall

2005 Atlantic hurricane season
Irene (2005)
Category 2 Atlantic hurricanes
Hurricanes in New Jersey
Irene